Arsenicicoccus bolidensis is a Gram-positive, coccus-shaped, non-spore-forming and facultatively anaerobic bacteria from the genus Arsenicicoccus which has been isolated from lake sediments from Boliden in Sweden.

References 

Micrococcales
Bacteria described in 2004